"Morning Sun" is a song by American recording artist Robin Thicke. It was made available for digital download and released as a standalone single on June 30, 2015, by Interscope Records.

Track listing 
Download digital
Morning Sun — 3:29

Music video
On June 29, 2015 Thicke uploaded the lyric video for "Morning Sun" on his YouTube and Vevo account.

Charts

References

2015 songs
2015 singles
Robin Thicke songs
Interscope Records singles
Song recordings produced by Max Martin
Disco songs
Songs written by Barry White
Songs written by Robin Thicke